In Ohio, State Route 194 may refer to:
Ohio State Route 194 (1923), now part of SR 500
Ohio State Route 194 (1920s-1960s), now part of SR 103